The Up to the Mountains and Down to the Countryside Movement, often known simply as the Down to the Countryside Movement, was a policy instituted in the People's Republic of China between mid 1950s and 1978. As a result of what he perceived to be pro-bourgeois thinking prevalent during the Cultural Revolution, Chairman Mao Zedong declared certain privileged urban youth would be sent to mountainous areas or farming villages to learn from the workers and farmers there. In total, approximately 17 million youth were sent to rural areas as a result of the movement. Usually only the oldest child had to go, but younger siblings could volunteer to go instead.

Chairman Mao's policy differed from Chinese President Liu Shaoqi's early 1960s sending-down policy in its political context. President Liu Shaoqi instituted the first sending-down policy to redistribute excess urban population following the Great Chinese Famine and the Great Leap Forward. Mao's stated aim for the policy was to ensure that urban students could "develop their talents to the full" through education amongst the rural population.

Many fresh high school graduates, who became known as the so-called sent-down youth (also known in China as "educated youth" and abroad as "rusticated youth"), were forced out of the cities and effectively exiled to remote areas of China. Some commentators consider these people, many of whom lost the opportunity to attend university, "China's Lost Generation". Famous authors who have written about their experiences during the movement include Nobel Laureate Liu Xiaobo, Jiang Rong, Ma Bo and Zhang Chengzhi, all of whom went to Inner Mongolia. Dai Sijie's Balzac and the Little Chinese Seamstress has received great praise for its take on life for the young people sent to rural villages of China during the movement (see scar literature). Communist Party General Secretary Xi Jinping was also among the youth sent to rural areas.

Resettlement in the countryside (chāduì luòhù) was a more permanent form.

Background
The Great Leap Forward campaign's aim was to increase agriculture, industrial productions, social change and ideological change. The Great Leap's goal of developing China's material productive forces was inextricably intertwined with the pursuit of communist social goals and the development of a popular communist consciousness. This failed and could have ended Mao Zedong's influence. Instead of moving forward into a more modern country, Mao and the CCP took a step back to the past. Harsh weather and gross economic mismanagement resulted in the worst famine in history. Mao's position with the party was weakened, so he worked on a plan that would be his defining moment and would give the Chinese a national identity. From here, he plotted his return to the pinnacle of power, which resulted in the Great Proletarian Cultural Revolution.

After the failure of Mao's Great Leap Forward, Mao was searching for a revolution, and that would become the Cultural Revolution. The Cultural Revolution did bring important changes in the social character and political climate of life in China but not so much in its formal institutions. Mao's power base was paramount. The revolution aimed to bring new social change in the 1960s and early years of the decade. The changes were important, nevertheless, vitally affecting the lives of the vast majority of the Chinese people. The revolution was an urban movement. It fought what was seen as excess successes of a growing population of urban workers, students, and intellectuals, who were seen as the prosperous bourgeoise. Mao wanted those classes to be more well-rounded in their approach to seeking societal success.  This would occur even at the cost of economic growth.

The Cultural Revolution consisted of many different smaller sub-campaigns that affected all of China, some of which came about quite quickly. One of these campaigns was the Monsters and Demons campaign that ran from 1966 to 1967. The campaign's name refers to metaphors such as "cow demons and snake spirits" that were used to demonize one's political opponent during the Cultural Revolution. Once someone was labeled as a "cow demon", they were to become imprisoned in a cowshed, storehouse or dark room. 
The country ended up in complete chaos once the Red Guards entered the picture. Therefore, the images displayed on posters showed a clear idea of what behavior and slogans were acceptable during this movement. From 1966 to 1968, all schools in China were closed, and the college entrance exams cancelled. Secondary and primary school students had the option to still go if they wished, which many did because they were curious as to what was going on. Schools were used as a rallying ground to interrogate those who were considered to be class enemies, such as teachers. In the beginning, the Cultural Revolution empowered the Red Guards into helping interrogate the class enemies and finding out whose houses to search and possibly destroy.

The Cultural Revolution started with Mao reaching out to high school students for ideological and material support. They were asked to target teachers viewed as possessing or propagating capitalist views and rebelling against them, which many were open to due to high academic pressure. During that time, the Red Guards participated in parades, mass meetings, and propagation and distribution of the Little Red Book. At this point, the politics initiated by Mao's government, along with the diminishing crops, had left the country in dire financial straits. Mao saw this as a prime opportunity to sow chaos and push the country towards the downfall of the old system, leaving a blank slate from which a reconstruction based on complete Communism would emerge. Thus, the central government did little to nothing to stop or discourage the Red Guards' acts, no matter how abusive.

Eventually, though, once Mao's cabinet tried to rein them in to start their program, most Red Guard squads refused to stop their activities, believing their fight not to be complete yet (or being unwilling to lose the privileges they held in the name of class struggle). Mao drastically changed his views about them and set up to break their power base by splitting them up.

From December 1968 onward, millions of educated urban youth, consisting of secondary school graduates and students, were mobilized and sent "up to the mountains and down to the villages" i.e. to rural villages and to frontier settlements. In these areas, they had to build up and take root, to receive reeducation from the poor and lower-middle peasants". Ten percent of the 1970 urban population was relocated. The population grew from 500 million to 700 million people in China. One way for Mao to handle the population growth was to send people to the countryside. Mao was from the countryside and wanted all educated youth to have experience there. This was a way for high school students to better integrate themselves into the working class. "In the beginning, the Cultural Revolution exhilarated me because suddenly I felt that I was allowed to think with my own head and say what was on my mind". While many believed that this was a great opportunity to transform themselves into a strong socialist youth, many students could not deal with the harsh life and died in the process of reeducation.

See also 

 Reform through labor
 Political prisoners in China

Citations

General references

External links
 Up to the Mountain, Down to the Village, a film by Chris Billing (2005)

Cultural Revolution
Maoist China
Maoist terminology
Social movements in China